Paraherbaspirillum is a gram-negative and non-spore-forming genus of bacteria in the family of Oxalobacteraceae with one known species (Paraherbaspirillum soli).

References

Burkholderiales
Bacteria genera
Monotypic bacteria genera